The next elections to the Iraqi Parliament are yet to be scheduled.

Background 
The 2021 Iraqi parliamentary election resulted in violent clashes in Baghdad as well as a political crisis of eleven months. On 3 August 2022, Muqtada al-Sadr called for snap elections.

Electoral system 
The electoral system was changed following the last parliamentary elections amid the 2019–2021 Iraqi protests. Previously conducted under proportional representation calculated using the Webster/Sainte-Laguë method with the governorates as constituencies, the 2021 elections were conducted under single non-transferable vote in 83 multi-member constituencies. The distribution of the number of electoral districts in each governorate relies on the number of quota seats for women multiplied by 3 or 5 seats for the electoral district depending on the governate's population size. One-quarter of total seats are reserved for women in the constituencies, while nine are reserved for minorities (5 for Christians and 1 each for Yazidis, Shabaks, Mandaeans and Feyli Kurds).

References 

Elections in Iraq
Future elections in Asia
2020s elections in Iraq